Mantel may refer to:

Mantel, Germany, a town in Bavaria, Germany
Fireplace mantel, a framework around a fireplace
Mantel Corporation, a fictional organization in the video game Haze
Mantel theorem, mathematical theorem in graph theory
Mantel (climbing), a climbing move used to surmount a ledge or feature in the rock in the absence of any useful holds directly above.

People
Bronwen Mantel, Canadian actress
Dave Mantel (1981–2018), Dutch actor, producer, and model
Dutch Mantel, ring name of Wayne Cowan (born 1949), American professional wrestler
Gerhard Mantel (1930–2012), German cellist and writer
Henriette Mantel (born 1954), American writer, actress, and director
Hilary Mantel (1952–2022), British novelist
Hugo Mantel, German footballer
Nathan Mantel (1919–2002), biostatistician
Gregory Mantel, a fictional character in the soap opera EastEnders

See also 
 Mantel clock
 Mantle (disambiguation)
 Mantell (disambiguation)

Surnames of German origin